Subhas Sumbhu Chakraborty (born 23 October 1985) is an Indian former football player. He is playing for Mumbai F.C. in the I-League as a midfielder.

External links
 
 Profile at Goal.com
 

Indian footballers
1985 births
Living people
Footballers from Kolkata
I-League players
East Bengal Club players
Mahindra United FC players
Mohun Bagan AC players
Mumbai FC players
United SC players
Air India FC players
India international footballers
India youth international footballers
Footballers at the 2006 Asian Games
Association football midfielders
Asian Games competitors for India